The Connecticut State Capitol Police is the law enforcement agency responsible for the  Connecticut State Capitol complex in Hartford.

History
In 1974, the Connecticut State Legislature created the "Office of the State Capitol Police". The operations of the State Capitol Police were supervised by the Connecticut State Police under the direction of the Joint Committee of Legislative Management, until 1996 when the Legislature reorganized the department as an independent police agency. The State Capitol Police Department maintains statewide jurisdiction and arrest powers to accommodate the diverse nature of their work.

National accreditation was granted to the State Capitol Police Department by the Commission on Accreditation for Law Enforcement Agencies  on March 22, 2003. Officers meet and maintain police officer certification standards, as mandated by state law and regulated by the Connecticut Police Officer Standards and Training Council.

The State Capitol Police Department was formerly led by (the now deceased) Chief Michael J. Fallon, a retired Assistant Chief of the City of Hartford Police Department.

On June 12, 2010, Walter Lee Jr. was appointed chief of police.

On February 7, 2020, Luiz Casanova was appointed chief of police.

Personnel

22 security technicians
One executive secretary

See also

List of law enforcement agencies in Connecticut
Connecticut General Assembly
Connecticut State Capitol

References

External links

State law enforcement agencies of Connecticut
Specialist police departments of Connecticut
1974 establishments in Connecticut
Capitol police
Organizations based in Hartford, Connecticut